Tulip Mazumdar is a British journalist and broadcaster who currently works for the BBC as their global health reporter.

Mazumdar is from Peterborough, Cambridgeshire, her first name chosen by her mother as she looked out on tulip fields in Lincolnshire. She is of Indian Bengali descent.

She attended The King's (The Cathedral) School, Peterborough,  and then the University of Liverpool before moving to work for BBC Radio Merseyside. From there she moved to the news department broadcasting on the BBC station 1Xtra. She has also worked on the BBC Radio 1 Newsbeat programme, the Radio 4 Today programme, Newsday on the BBC World Service and appeared on BBC television where she has reported from Helmand, Afghanistan, on the conflict and its impact on local communities. In 2014, Mazumdar reported for the BBC and world media on the Ebola virus epidemic in Sierra Leone.

References

External links
 

Living people
British people of Bengali descent
People from Spalding, Lincolnshire
BBC Radio 1 presenters
BBC Radio 1Xtra presenters
BBC Radio 4 presenters
BBC World Service presenters
Alumni of the University of Liverpool
English broadcasters
English journalists
Date of birth missing (living people)
BBC News people
WFTV Award winners
British women television journalists
British women radio presenters
Year of birth missing (living people)